Gtashen is a village in the Amasia Municipality of the Shirak Province of Armenia.

History 
Armenians and Azeris once lived in the village, as well as Greeks, who even had a church, of which a half-ruined wall remains in the center of the village. In 1988-1989 Armenians from Akhalkalaki, Gyumri, Talin, Amasia and Nagorno-Karabakh settled in the village.

Demographics
According to 1912 publication of Kavkazskiy kalendar, 495 people, mainly Karapapakhs lived in village Magaradjik of Kars Okrug of Kars Oblast.

The community of Gtashen consists of the villages of Gtashen and Kamkhut. The Statistical Committee of Armenia reported that the community's population was 258 in 2010, down from 378 at the 2001 census.

The population of the village since 1886 is as follows:

References 

Communities in Shirak Province
Populated places in Shirak Province